The Azb DMR MK1 or Azb MK1 is a Pakistani light weight semi-automatic designated marksman rifle designed and manufactured by the POF. It was first unveiled at the December 2014 IDEAS exhibition. It is believed to be named after the Counter-terrorist operation in North-West Pakistan Operation Zarb-e-Azb which had just been commenced at the time the Sniper rifle was introduced. It itself was designed for the Low intensity operations that were occurring during its time. The rifle has took part in many international defence exhibitions and has been offered for export.

Characteristics
The Azb sniper rifle is comparatively light weight, medium-range, cost-effective and easy to produce. According to some sources it is made from G3 parts and is therefore compatible and interchangeable with it. It is compatible with multiple Optical sights, thermal optics and Night-vision device. It is a semi-automatic Designated marksman rifle/Sniper rifle/Service rifle featuring a 20 inch cold hammer forged match grade bull barrel. It operates with a Caliber of 7.62×51mm NATO, operates a Roller locked delayed blowback mechanism with a 5/20 rounds capacity magazine, it has an overall length of 1055 mm with a 508 mm long barrel, it weighs 4.94 kg without the magazine and has a plastic fixed Butt stock. It can quickly and effectively engage multiple targets at a maximum range of 600 mm with an accuracy of 2 MOA (Minute of Angle) at 100 m range.

Operators

 Pakistan Army

See also

Comparable Sniper rifles
Pindad SPR
Komodo Armament D7CH
Istiglal anti-materiel rifle
Yalguzag sniper rifle
MKEK JNG-90
T-12 sniper rifle
Kalekalıp KNT-308
Siyavash sniper rifle
Arash (sniper rifle)
Tabuk Sniper Rifle
CAR 817 DMR

Other POF products
POF Eye
HMG PK-16
LSR
PSR-90

References 

7.62×51mm NATO semi-automatic rifles
Designated marksman rifles
Weapons and ammunition introduced in 2014
Pakistani inventions
Roller-delayed blowback firearms
Sniper rifles of Pakistan